The Shop Stewards Movement was a movement which brought together shop stewards from across the United Kingdom during the First World War. It originated with the Clyde Workers Committee, the first shop stewards committee in Britain, which organised against the imprisonment of three of their members in 1915. Most of them were members of the Amalgamated Society of Engineers (ASE). In November 1916 the Sheffield Workers Committee was formed when members of the ASE there went on strike against the conscription of a local engineer. The government brought the strike to an end by exempting craft union members such as ASE engineers from military service. However when this policy was reversed in May 1917, this met by a strike involving 200,000 workers in 48 towns. The Shop Stewards Movement arose from organising this strike.

In 1917, a National Administrative Committee was established for what was named the Shop Stewards' and Workers' Committees.  George Peet of the Manchester-based Joint Engineering Shop Stewards' Committee was elected as secretary, while Arthur MacManus of the Clyde Workers' Committee was chair, and J. T. Murphy from the Sheffield Workers' Committee was assistant secretary.  Two months after the formation of the committee, it merged with a movement for the amalgamation of engineering unions, which had been founded in 1915 but had achieved little during the war.  The organisation supported the October Revolution, and Peet represented it on the committee of the Hands Off Russia movement.

The movement became gradually less active until 1920, when Willie Gallacher, David Ramsay, Ted Lismer and J. T. Murphy organised a national conference of the movement.  The conference agreed to affiliate to the Communist International (Comintern).  Gallacher, Murphy, Ramsay and Jack Tanner represented the group at the Second Congress of the Comintern, later in the year,  but affiliation was not permitted, on the grounds that the organisation was not a political party.  Gallacher rejected suggestions that the movement should affiliate to the International Trade Union Council, a recently founded group of communist trade unions, arguing that it was necessary for members to remain active within mainstream trade unions.  Instead, in September, a compromise was agreed: the movement would affiliate to the new Red International of Labour Unions, while individual members who also held membership of the new Communist Party of Great Britain would come under the discipline of that group.

The Shop Stewards' and Workers' Committee became part of the National Workers' Committee in 1921, and it agitated unsuccessfully for a general strike on Black Friday.  The National Workers' Committee in turn merged with the British Bureau in 1922, Peet remaining joint secretary for a year, after which the Comintern ordered that Gallacher and J. R. Campbell replace Peet and Lismer among the leaders of the movement.

References

Labour movement in the United Kingdom
United Kingdom in World War I